The Will to Death is the fifth studio album by American musician John Frusciante, released on June 22, 2004 on Record Collection. The album reached #36 on the Top Independent Albums chart.

The vinyl edition of the record saw a repressing from Record Collection on December 11, 2012.  These reissued records are 180 gram and come with a download of choice between MP3 and WAV formats of the album.

Frequent collaborator Josh Klinghoffer appears, performing drums, bass, guitar, and keyboard.

The album cover is a photo taken on Cimitero Monumentale di Milano. The man is Luigi Ontani.

Background and recording
In 2004 Frusciante announced that he would produce six albums during a six-month break from the Red Hot Chili Peppers, with The Will to Death being the first of these.  Following the long and costly recording of his previous album, Shadows Collide With People, Frusciante decided to experiment with recording music quickly and in a minimalist fashion, performing a maximum of two takes per track.

Frusciante has stated that the album is intended to be "the opposite of Shadows Collide With People": 

On January 16, 2013, John provided a definition and theory of "The Will to Death" on his website.

Track listing

Personnel
The following people contributed to The Will to Death:

Musicians
 John Frusciante – vocals, guitar, piano, synthesizer, bass guitar on "Far Away", "Unchanging" and "The Will to Death"
 Josh Klinghoffer – drums, bass, keyboards, guitar on "Helical" and "The Will to Death"

Recording personnel
 John Frusciante - producer 
 Ryan Hewitt - engineer, mixing
 Rafael Serrano - recording assistant
 Jeff Moses - recording assistant
 Bernie Grundman - mastering
 Dave Lee - equipment

Artwork
 Lola Montes Schnabel - cover photograph
 Mike Piscitelli - design
 John Frusciante - design

References

External links
 www.johnfrusciante.com - John Frusciante's official site

John Frusciante albums
2004 albums